The United States District Court for the Eastern District of Michigan (in case citations, E.D. Mich.) is the federal district court with jurisdiction over of the eastern half of the Lower Peninsula of the State of Michigan. The Court is based in Detroit, with courthouses also located in Ann Arbor, Bay City, Flint, and Port Huron. The United States Court of Appeals for the Sixth Circuit has appellate jurisdiction over the court (except for patent claims and claims against the U.S. government under the Tucker Act, which are appealed to the Federal Circuit).

, the United States Attorney is Dawn N. Ison.

History 

The district court was not assigned to a judicial circuit, but was granted the same jurisdiction as United States circuit courts, except in appeals and writs of error, which were the jurisdiction of the Supreme Court. Due to the so-called "Toledo War", a boundary dispute with Ohio, Michigan did not become a state of the Union until January 26, 1837. On March 3, 1837, Congress passed an act that repealed the circuit court jurisdiction of the U.S. District Court for the District of Michigan, assigned the District of Michigan to the Seventh Circuit, and established a U.S. circuit court for the district, .

Ross Wilkins, who had been the only district judge to serve the District of Michigan, was reassigned to the Eastern District.

Divisions 

The Eastern District comprises two divisions.

Northern Division 

The Northern Division comprises the counties of Alcona, Alpena, Arenac, Bay, Cheboygan, Clare, Crawford, Gladwin, Gratiot, Huron, Iosco, Isabella, Midland, Montmorency, Ogemaw, Oscoda, Otsego, Presque Isle, Roscommon, Saginaw, and Tuscola.

Court for the Northern Division is held in Bay City.

Southern Division 

The Southern Division comprises the counties of Genesee, Jackson, Lapeer, Lenawee, Livingston, Macomb, Monroe, Oakland, Saint Clair, Sanilac, Shiawassee, Washtenaw, and Wayne.

Court for the Southern Division is held in Ann Arbor, Detroit, Flint, and Port Huron.

Notable cases 

Some of the notable cases that have come before the United States District Court for the Eastern District of Michigan include:

Current judges 
:

Vacancies and pending nominations

Former judges

Chief judges

Succession of seats

See also 
 Courts of Michigan
 List of current United States district judges
 List of United States federal courthouses in Michigan

References

External links 
 United States District Court for the Eastern District of Michigan Official Website
 United States Attorney for the Eastern District of Michigan Official Website

Michigan
Courthouses in Michigan
Michigan law
Ann Arbor, Michigan
Bay City, Michigan
Organizations based in Detroit
Flint, Michigan
Metro Detroit
Port Huron, Michigan
St. Clair County, Michigan
Wayne County, Michigan
1863 establishments in Michigan
Courts and tribunals established in 1863